Absalom Andrew Sydenstricker (1852–1931) was an American Presbyterian missionary to China from 1880 to 1931.  The Sydenstricker log house at what later became the Pearl S. Buck Birthplace in Hillsboro, West Virginia, was Absalom's early childhood home.

His daughter, Pearl S. Buck, became an award-winning author. The book Fighting Angel, written as a companion to her memoir of her mother, The Exile, recounts the life and work of Absalom (called "Andrew" in the book).  Her representation of her father was conflicted between respect for his steadfastness, and bitterness for his treatment of her mother. She wrote that his was

This brief summary of the family life and missionary work of Absalom and Caroline Maude "Carie" (Stulting) Sydenstricker (1857–1921) shows the perseverance, under extreme hardships, of missionaries to China during this time period.

The names of the family members appear in quotes as they are given in the books The Exile and Fighting Angel.  Absalom is called "Andrew", Caroline is called "Carie", Pearl is called "Comfort".  Names of cities of China are given in the modern Pinyin form, with names used in the books given in parentheses.

Notes 
That whole chart is copied from somewhere else.

Bibliography
 , originally New York: John Day.
 Buck, Pearl S. The Exile. Portrait of an American Mother (John Day, 1936; rpr. with a new Introduction, Norwalk, CT: EastBridge, D'Asia Vu Reprint Library, 2009 .
 .
 .
 .

1852 births
1931 deaths
American expatriates in China
American Presbyterian missionaries
People from Hillsboro, West Virginia
Presbyterian Church in the United States members
Presbyterian missionaries in China
Presbyterians from West Virginia